"The Sky Is Crying" is a blues standard written and initially recorded by Elmore James in 1959.  Called "one of his most durable compositions", "The Sky Is Crying" became a R&B record chart hit and has been interpreted and recorded by numerous artists.

Composition and recording
"The Sky Is Crying" is a slow-tempo twelve-bar blues notated in 12/8 time in the key of C.  It is an impromptu song inspired by a Chicago downpour during the recording session:  

The songs features prominent slide guitar by James with his vocals, accompanied by his longtime backing band, the Broomdusters: J. T. Brown on saxophone, Johnny Jones on piano, Odie Payne on drums, and Homesick James on bass.  James' unique slide guitar sound on the recording has generated some debate; Homesick James attributed it to a recording studio technique, others have suggested a different amplifier or guitar setup, and Ry Cooder felt that it was an altogether different guitar than James' usual Kay acoustic with an attached pickup.

Release and recognition
The single, with the artist credit "Elmo James and His Broomdusters", reached number 15 on Billboard magazine's Hot R&B Sides chart in 1960, making it James' last chart showing before his death in 1963. James recorded a variation of the song, "The Sun Is Shining", in April 1960, five months after the recording date of "The Sky Is Crying" (although some places "Sun" as a precursor to "Sky", possibly because the bulk of James' recordings for Fire/Fury/Enjoy took place after the Chess recordings).

"The Sky Is Crying" is identified as a blues standard and in 1991, James' original was inducted into the Blues Foundation Hall of Fame in the "Classics of Blues Recordings" category. Record producer Bobby Robinson noted that the song is "a magnificent vehicle both for Elmore's emotion-packed blues vocal and his ringing slide guitar".

Renditions
In 1969, Albert King recorded "The Sky Is Crying" for the album Years Gone By. Unlike James' who played it with a slide, King used a fretted approach on guitar. Stevie Ray Vaughan later performed the song regularly as an apparent tribute to King. He and his backing band, Double Trouble, recorded versions during the sessions for their 1984 album Couldn't Stand the Weather and 1985's Soul to Soul. Neither was released until the posthumous compilations Blues at Sunrise (2000) and The Sky Is Crying (1991), respectively.  Critic Dan Forte noted, "Stevie tips his Clint Eastwood hat to two of his idols: Elmore James, who wrote the tune, and Albert King, who also recorded it, and
whose influence is evident in every lick and bend here [on the 1991 release]."

References

1959 songs
Elmore James songs
1959 singles
Songs written by Elmore James
Albert King songs
Freddie King songs
Stevie Ray Vaughan songs
Blues songs